Gufroni Al Maruf (born 30 November 1996) is an Indonesian professional footballer who plays as a right winger for Liga 2 club Dewa United.

Club career

Gresik United
He made his professional debut in the Liga 1 on April 18, 2017 against Persipura Jayapura at the Mandala Stadium, Jayapura.

Madura FC
In 2018 Gufroni signed with Madura for the 2018 Liga 2. He made 21 league appearances and scored 4 goals for Madura FC.

Madura United
He was signed for Madura United to play in Liga 1 in the 2019 season.

Persis Solo (loan)
He was signed for Persis Solo to play in Liga 2 in the 2020 season, on loan from Madura United. This season was suspended on 27 March 2020 due to the COVID-19 pandemic. The season was abandoned and was declared void on 20 January 2021.

Persikabo 1973
In 2021, Gufroni signed a contract with Indonesian Liga 1 club Persikabo 1973.

Dewa United FC
In 2021, Gufroni signed a contract with Indonesian Liga 2 club Dewa United. He made his league debut on 28 September against RANS Cilegon at the Gelora Bung Karno Madya Stadium, Jakarta.

Honours

Club 
Dewa United
 Liga 2 third place (play-offs): 2021

References

External links
 
 Gufroni Al Maruf at Liga Indonesia

Living people
1996 births
Indonesian footballers
Sportspeople from Malang
Sportspeople from East Java
Persegres Gresik players
Gresik United players
Madura United F.C. players
Persis Solo players
Persikabo 1973 players
Dewa United F.C. players
Liga 1 (Indonesia) players
Liga 2 (Indonesia) players
Association football midfielders